Rodrigo Abascal Barros (born 14 January 1994) is a Uruguayan footballer who plays as a defender for Portuguese club Boavista.

Club career
On 26 July 2021, he signed a three-year contract with Portuguese Primeira Liga club Boavista.

References

External links

1994 births
Footballers from Montevideo
Living people
Uruguayan footballers
Association football defenders
Centro Atlético Fénix players
Juventud de Las Piedras players
Peñarol players
Boavista F.C. players
Uruguayan Primera División players
Primeira Liga players
Uruguayan expatriate footballers
Expatriate footballers in Portugal
Uruguayan expatriate sportspeople in Portugal